Federica Falzon (born 17 February 2003) is a Maltese mezzo-soprano singer. She represented Malta at the Junior Eurovision Song Contest 2014 on home soil with the song "Diamonds", and placed 4th.

Life and career
Federica Falzon was born on 17 February 2003 in a rural village named Safi, Malta. She has been interested in music for most of her life, and has started singing at age 8.  Her grandpa took her to karaoke clubs where most people encouraged her to take singing lessons.  In 2011, Falzon sang in front of an audience for the first time at Festa Hiliet.  There, she sang two songs - "Sailing" by The Sutherland Brothers, and "Rose Garden" by Lynn Anderson.

Federica started out as a country-pop singer, but discovered her passion for classical music through her vocal tutor and mentor Gillian Attard from Malta's La Voix Academy. Falzon has also taken part in Sanremo D.O.C. and won RAI UNO's Ti lascio una canzone 2014, despite not knowing any Italian when she arrived in Italy. In November 2013, Falzon won Ghanja Gmiel is-Seba Noti with an original song titled "Ilwien il-Holqien" (Nature's colours).

On 18 July, Falzon was one of the guest performers in the annual concert held on the Granaries Floriana by Maltese tenor and internationally acclaimed Joseph Calleja.

Junior Eurovision Song Contest 2014

On 15 November 2014, Federica represented Malta at the Junior Eurovision Song Contest 2014 on home soil. According to lyricist Matt Muxu Mercieca, the song talks about how Federica finds her “way out of the storm” and how “together we can all shine, like diamonds in the sky.” The song placed 4th with 116 points.

Discography

Singles

References

2003 births
Living people
21st-century Maltese women singers
21st-century Maltese singers
Maltese child singers
Junior Eurovision Song Contest entrants for Malta
People from Safi, Malta